The Sterling Infants were a minor league baseball team based in Sterling, Illinois. In 1910, the Sterling Infants played as members of the Class D level Northern Association. Previously, the 1890 Sterling Blue Coats were briefly members of the 1890 Illinois-Iowa League. Both teams played a partial season in their leagues and hosted minor league home games at the Sporting Association Grounds.

Baseball Hall of Fame member Bud Fowler played for the 1890 Sterling Blue Coats, integrating the team and the Illinois–Iowa League.

History
Minor league baseball began in Sterling, Illinois when the 1890 Sterling Blue Coats became members of the 1890 Independent level Illinois-Iowa League. After Sterling began play in the eight–team league, the Blue Coats had a record of 21–51 on July 31, 1890 when the franchise moved to nearby Galesburg, Illinois. On September 4, 1890, the Galesburg Pavers, after compiling an 8–17 record in Galesburg, moved again to Burlington, Iowa to become the Burlington Hawkeyes. In Burlington, the franchise disbanded on September 10, 1890.

The 1890 Sterling/Galesburg/Burlington team finished with a 30–72 overall record when they disbanded. The team was in 8th place in the Illinois-Iowa League standings, finishing 33.5 games behind the 1st place Ottumwa Coal Palace Kings (63–43). Baseball Hall of Fame member Bud Fowler played for the Sterling/Galesburg/Burlington team in 1890, hitting.322 for the season.Bud Fowler played for the Sterling/Galesburg/Burlington team. Fowler was the first known African-American to play professional baseball, becoming a pioneer for baseball players.Baseball Hall of Fame member Bud Fowler played for the Sterling/Galesburg/Burlington team in 1890, hitting.322 for the season. Playing for the Sterling/Galesburg/Burlington team in 1890, Fowler hit .322 for the season.

In 1910, minor league baseball returned to Sterling during the season. On June 21, 1910, the Joliet Jolly-ites of the Class D level Northern Association relocated to Sterling with a 21–18 record. The Sterling "Infants" played the remainder of the season, having a 3–16 record in Sterling to finish with a 24–34 overall record. The Joliet Jolly-ites/Sterling Infants placed 6th in the Northern Association standings under manager Hunkey Hines. The Northern League permanently disbanded on July 19, 1910.

Sterling, Illinois has not hosted another minor league team.

The ballpark
The Sterling Blue Coats and Sterling Infants played home minor league games at the Sporting Association Grounds in Sterling, Illinois. The location of the Sterling Association Grounds ballpark is not known.

Timeline

Year–by–year records

Notable alumni

Baseball Hall of Fame alumni
Bud Fowler (1890) Elected, 2021

Notable alumni

Varney Anderson (1890)
Fritz Clausen (1890)
James Donnelly (1890, MGR)
Hunkey Hines (1910, MGR)
Jack Scheible (1890)

See also
Sterling (minor league baseball) players

References

External links
Stats Crew

Defunct minor league baseball teams
Professional baseball teams in Illinois
Defunct baseball teams in Illinois
Baseball teams established in 1910
Baseball teams disestablished in 1910
1910 establishments in Illinois
1910 disestablishments in Illinois
Sterling, Illinois
Whiteside County, Illinois
Northern Association teams